Tanya Talaga is a Canadian journalist and author of Anishinaabe and Polish descent. She worked as a journalist at the Toronto Star for over twenty years, covering health, education, local issues, and investigations. She is now a regular columnist with the Globe and Mail. Her 2017 book Seven Fallen Feathers: Racism, Death, and Hard Truths in a Northern City was met with acclaim, winning the 2018 RBC Taylor Prize for non-fiction and the 2017 Shaughnessy Cohen Prize for Political Writing. Talaga is the first woman of Anishinaabe descent to be named a CBC Massey Lecturer. She holds honorary doctorates from Lakehead University and from Ryerson University.

Early life and education 
Talaga is of mixed heritage, describing her ancestry as being one-fourth Ojibwe (Anishinaabe) and half Polish. Her maternal grandmother is a member of Fort William First Nation and her great-grandmother, Liz Gauthier, was a residential school survivor. She was raised in Toronto and spent summers with her mother's family in Raith, Ontario, a small community one hour northwest of Thunder Bay. When she was twenty years old, she learned that a sister had been given up for adoption and that three of her mother's siblings had also grown up in the foster care system. She notes that these experiences influenced her later work on the impacts of residential schools and intergenerational trauma.

Talaga studied history and political science at the University of Toronto. She wrote and edited the university's student newspaper The Varsity and volunteered on The Strand, a publication of Victoria College.

Career 
Talaga was hired by the Toronto Star in 1995 as an intern. She worked as a general city reporter for 14 years, covering several beats, before transferring in 2009 to the Queen's Park Bureau. She also wrote as the indigenous issues columnist.

Her first book, Seven Fallen Feathers: Racism, Death, and Hard Truths in a Northern City, was released in 2017 to critical acclaim and shortlisted for numerous awards in both 2017 and 2018. The book examines the deaths of seven First Nations youths in Thunder Bay, Ontario, and began when Talaga was assigned to write a story about why more First Nations people were not voting in the 2011 federal election, only to find that many people were reluctant to cooperate with her story because the deaths were not its focus.

Talaga delivered the 2018 Massey Lectures, entitled All Our Relations: Finding the Path Forward. Based on her 2018 Massey Lectures, Talaga released her second book, All Our Relations: Finding the Path Forward, which shares the name with the lecture series. In 2020, it was one of five books shortlisted for the British Academy’s Nayef Al-Rodhan Prize for Global Cultural Understanding.

Talaga's first podcast, the seven episode Seven Truths, which tells contemporary stories through the lens of the Anishinaabe Seven Grandfather Teachings, was released by Audible on November 26, 2020.

Talaga also owns the production company Makwa Creative Inc. Her documentary film Spirit to Soar premiered at the 2021 Hot Docs Canadian International Documentary Festival, where it won the Audience Award in the mid-length film category.

Awards

Book awards 
Awards for Seven Fallen Feathers: Racism, Death and Hard Truths in a Northern City:
 RBC Taylor Prize (2018)
 Shaughnessy Cohen Prize (2018)
Periodical Marketers of Canada, Indigenous Literature Award (2018)
 Finalist, B.C. National Award for Canadian Non-Fiction (2018)
 Nominee, Hilary Weston Writers' Trust Prize for Nonfiction (2018)
Finalist, Speaker's Book Award (2017)

Fellowships 
 Atkinson Fellowship in Public Policy (2017–2018)

Journalism awards 
 National Newspaper Award for the Gone Series (2015)
 National Newspaper Award, year long project on the Rana Plaza building collapse. (2013)
 Michener Award in public service journalism, five-time nominee.

References

External links
 Tanya Talaga official website
 Systemic Racism against Indigenous People in Thunder Bay – A podcast episode with Tanya Talaga commenting on the OIPRD Report, BROKEN TRUST: Indigenous People and the Thunder Bay Police Service

Living people
Year of birth missing (living people)
21st-century Canadian essayists
21st-century Canadian women writers
First Nations activists
Canadian women essayists
Canadian newspaper journalists
First Nations journalists
First Nations women writers
Toronto Star people
Ojibwe people
Canadian people of Polish descent
Canadian investigative journalists
Canadian women journalists
21st-century First Nations writers
Canadian documentary film directors
Canadian women film directors
Film directors from Ontario
Writers from Ontario
Canadian women podcasters
Canadian women documentary filmmakers